The 2006 Open Gaz de France was a women's tennis tournament played on indoor hard courts. It was the 14th edition of the Open Gaz de France and was part of Tier II of the 2006 WTA Tour. The tournament took place at the Stade Pierre de Coubertin in Paris in France from February 6 through February 12, 2006. Amélie Mauresmo won the singles title.

Finasl

Singles

 Amélie Mauresmo defeated  Mary Pierce 6–1, 7–6(7–2)
 It was Mauresmo's 2nd title of the year and the 22nd title of her career.

Doubles

 Émilie Loit /  Květa Peschke defeated  Cara Black /  Rennae Stubbs 7–6(7–5), 6–4
 It was Loit's 2nd title of the year and the 18th title of her career. It was Peschke's 1st title of the year and the 6th title of her career.

External links
 ITF tournament edition details

Open Gaz de France
Open GDF Suez
2006 in French women's sport
Open Gaz de France
Open Gaz de France
Open Gaz de France